José Vicente Barbosa du Bocage (2 May 1823 – 3 November 1907) was a Portuguese zoologist and politician. He was the curator of Zoology at the Museu Nacional de Lisboa in Lisbon. He published numerous works on mammals, birds, and fishes. In the 1880s he became the Minister of the Navy and later the Minister for Foreign Affairs for Portugal. The zoology collection at the Lisbon Museum is called the Bocage Museum in his honor.

Du Bocage was born in Funchal, Madeira.  He studied at the University of Coimbra from 1839 to 1846. He became lecturer of the chair of Zoology at the Polytechnic School, Lisbon (later the Science Faculty of the University of Lisbon) in 1851, where he taught for more than 30 years. In 1858, he became also the scientific director and curator of Zoology of the Natural History Museum of the Polytechnic School. which was established as a support for the chair.

His work at the Museum consisted in acquiring, describing and coordinating collections, many of which arrived from the Portuguese colonies in Africa, such as Angola, Mozambique, etc., sent by noted naturalists such as José Alberto de Oliveira Anchieta (1832–1897). For this purpose, du Bocage standardized the procedures for collecting, preparing and sending specimens to the Museum in his book “Instrucções Prácticas sobre o Modo de Colligir, Preparar e Remetter Productos Zoológicos para o Museu de Lisboa” (1862). In 1860 he succeeded in getting back some collections which were removed from the Museum during the Napoleonic invasion of Portugal, by the French naturalist Étienne Geoffroy Saint-Hilaire (1772–1844), which included precious specimens collected by Alexandre Rodrigues Ferreira (1756–1815) in Brazil.

In 1875, he was elected Vice-President of the Academia Real das Ciências de Lisboa. He retired from educational activities in 1880 but remained director of the Museum until he devoted his remaining life to politics, first as the Minister of Navy and Ultramarine Possessions and later as Minister of Foreign Affairs, from 1883 to 1886, and again in 1890. His political activities as Minister include the management of several diplomatic treatises with European powers on the subject of Portugal's possessions in Africa. Most notably are his involvement with the Berlin Conference, and also in the negotiations following the 1890 British Ultimatum forced upon Portugal.

Du Bocage published more than 200 taxonomic papers about mammals, birds, reptiles, amphibians, fishes, and many others. He was responsible for identifying many new species, several of which he named according to the naturalist who found them (for example, dozens of new species received the specific name, anchietae, honoring Portuguese naturalist José Alberto de Oliveira Anchieta).

Du Bocage is commemorated in the scientific names of two species of lizards: Podarcis bocagei and Trachylepis bocagii.

José Vicente was a second cousin of the famous poet Manuel Maria Barbosa du Bocage (1765–1805). 

On April 10, 1905, a governmental decree renamed the zoological section of the National Museum of Lisbon as the "Museu José Vicente Barboza du Bocage".

Du Bocage died in Lisbon, Portugal, aged 83.

Selected works
A ornitologia dos Açores, 1866
Aves das possessões portuguesas d’ Africa occidental que existem no Museu de Lisboa, da 1ª à 24ª lista, 1868 a 1882
Lista dos répteis das possessões portuguesas d’ Africa occidental que existem no Museu de Lisboa, 1866
Notice sur un batracien nouveau du Portugal, 1864
Diagnose de algumas espécies inéditas da família Squalidae que frequentam os nossos mares, 1864
Peixes plagiostomos, 1866
Ornithologie d’ Angola, 1881 and 1877
Herpethologie d’ Angola et du Congo, 1895.

References

Further reading
Almaça C (1987). "A Zoologia e a Antropologia na Escola Politécnica e na Faculdade de Ciências (até 1983) ". In: Fac. Ciências da Univ. Lisboa. Passado/Presente e Perspectivas Futuras, 150º aniversário da Escola Politécnica, 75º aniv. Fac. Ciências. pp. 293–312. (in Portuguese).
Burnay E (1903). "Comemorações Sociaes – O conselheiro Barboza du Bocage". Boletim da Sociedade de Geographia de Lisboa, 21ª. Série, (7): 245–253. (in Portuguese).
Osório B (1915). "Elogio Histórico do Illustre Naturalista e Professor J.V. Barboza du Bocage". Memórias do Museu Bocage 1–42. (in Portuguese).

External links
 J.V. Barbosa du Bocage. A very complete site, with biography, list of publications, letters, etc. (In Portuguese)
 

1823 births
1907 deaths
Portuguese zoologists
Government ministers of Portugal
Foreign ministers of Portugal
University of Coimbra alumni
People from Funchal
Portuguese people of Dutch descent
Portuguese people of French descent
19th-century Portuguese people
Naval ministers of Portugal